Trans Caribbean Airways was a United States airline owned by O. Roy Chalk.  Its hub was San Juan, Puerto Rico.  Founded in 1945, it was acquired by American Airlines in 1971. Its headquarters was located at 714 Fifth Avenue in Midtown Manhattan, New York City.

History
The main headquarters for Trans Caribbean Airways was in New York for most of the time until it was acquired by American Airlines on March 3, 1971. There was a building in San Juan that was owned by TCA and has a full wall done in tile with the TCA logo.

The female flight attendants wore an unusual uniform hat for a U.S. carrier; it was supposed to be a copy of the Spanish Cordovan hat the color Blue trim in Aqua. It represented the Spanish influence of the Caribbean islands. The uniform was designed by Mrs. O. Roy Chalk, wife of the owner. The last paint job on the tail of the aircraft was a navy blue with an orange palm tree.

Planes were also chartered to Military Air Transport for service from McGuire AFB to Frankfurt, West Germany.  The troops referred to it as "Trashcan Airlines".

At the time of its acquisition by American Airlines, Trans Caribbean was operating a small fleet of Douglas DC-8 and Boeing 727 jetliners.

Destinations
According to the Trans Caribbean system timetable dated July 7, 1969, the following destinations were served on the east coast of the U.S. and the Caribbean:
 Aruba (AUA)
 Curacao (CUR)
 Newark Liberty International Airport (EWR)
 New York City John F. Kennedy International Airport (JFK)
 Port Au Prince (PAP)
 St. Croix (STX)
 St. Thomas (STT)
 San Juan (SJU)
 Washington, D.C. Dulles International Airport (IAD)

Fleet 

Trans Caribbean operated the following aircraft types during its existence:
 Boeing 727-100
 Boeing 727-200
 Douglas DC-4
 Douglas DC-6B
 2 Douglas DC-8-51
 3 Douglas DC-8-54CF (convertible passenger/freighter version)
 1 Douglas DC-8-55CF
 3 Douglas DC-8-61CF (stretched Super DC-8 version)

See also 
 List of defunct airlines of the United States

References 

Defunct airlines of the United States
Airlines established in 1945
Airlines disestablished in 1971
Defunct companies based in New York City
American Airlines